The 2000 Pocono 500 was the fifteenth stock car race of the 2000 NASCAR Winston Cup Series. It was scheduled for June 18, 2000, but was held on June 19, 2000 due to inclement weather at Pocono Raceway in Long Pond, Pennsylvania. The 200-lap race was won by Jeremy Mayfield for the Penske Racing team. Dale Jarrett finished second and his Robert Yates Racing teammate Ricky Rudd came in third.

The race, originally scheduled for June 18, was delayed to June 19 due to persistent rain and enveloping fog. Mayfield won the race by bumping Earnhardt out of the way on the last corner of the last lap.

There were five cautions and twenty-four lead changes among eleven different drivers during the course of the race. The result left Bobby Labonte in first position in the Drivers' Championship, fifty-seven points ahead of second-place driver Dale Earnhardt and one-hundred and fifteen ahead of Dale Jarrett.

Report

Background
Pocono Raceway is one of six superspeedways to hold NASCAR races; the others are Daytona International Speedway, Michigan International Speedway, Auto Club Speedway, Indianapolis Motor Speedway and Talladega Superspeedway. The track's turns are banked differently; the first is banked at 14°, the second turn at 8° and the final turn with 6°. However, each of the three straightaways are banked at 2°.

Before the race, Bobby Labonte led the Drivers' Championship with 2,116 points, and Dale Earnhardt stood in second with 2,018 points. Ward Burton was third in the Drivers' Championship with 2,014 points, Dale Jarrett was fourth with 1,955 points, and Jeff Burton was in fifth with 1,868 points. In the Manufacturers' Championship, Ford was leading with 95 points, nine points ahead of their rival Pontiac. Chevrolet was in third with 82 points.

Entry list

Qualifying

Race recap
The race, the fifteenth race out of a total of thirty-four in the season, was due to commence at 1 p.m. EDT on June 18. NASCAR officials postponed the race to 10 a.m. EDT on June 19 as persistent rain and a layer of fog obscured parts of the speedway. The race was televised live on TNN.

Race results

References

Pocono 500
Pocono 500
NASCAR races at Pocono Raceway